Ed Cooper Clarke is a writer and actor from London, England.

Education
Cooper Clarke graduated from The Drama Centre London, Class of 2008/2009.

Career

In season 2 of The Crown, Cooper Clark appeared as Jeremy Fry, best man to Antony Armstrong-Jones.

Cooper Clarke was seen in ITV's Downton Abbey, playing the Honourable Timothy Grey, the second son of Lord Merton.

His first role on TV was as a scientist on BBC's Spooks.

More recently, he played Mark Hooper, an unhinged cryptozoologist, in ITV's Whitechapel (series 4, episode 5).

In 2017 he appeared in BBC's Father Brown as Robert Malmort in episode 5.2 "The Labyrinth of the Minotaur".

Clarke is also known for his role as Captain Fitzroy in the Theatre Royal Bath production of The Madness of George III, which ran in London's West End in early 2012, having toured the UK during 2011.

Other theatre work has included:
David Hoylake-Johnston in the 2011 UK tour of The Reluctant Debutante, 
Silva Vacarro in Tennessee Williams' Tiger Tail, and 
Phillips in Alan Bennett's Single Spies.

He has produced a short film, Pudding Bowl. and created a play for the Edinburgh Fringe called Lewis in Wonderland.

Filmography

References

External links
 
 Mentioned in review of The Reluctant Debutante

Alumni of the Drama Centre London
English male stage actors
Living people
Male actors from London
Year of birth missing (living people)